Mastophora may refer to:
 Mastophora (spider), a genus of bolas spiders
 Mastophora (alga), a red alga genus in the subfamily Mastophoroideae